The 2009–10 National League A season was the third ice hockey season of the National League A since the reorganization of the Swiss league. Prior to the season, no promotion and relegation occurred between the National League A and National League B as a result of NLA club Biel's victory over Lausanne in the prior season's relegation playoff.

Format 
The regular season schedule consists of a double round-robin, each of the league's twelve teams playing the other eleven four times apiece, twice at home and twice on the road. Each team plays an additional six games against three opponents, which are schedules based upon the previous season's standings. At the conclusion of the regular season, the top eight teams are entered into the playoffs; the bottom four enter a relegation playoff, commonly called the playout. Each playoff and playout series is contested in a best-of-seven fashion. The loser of the playout plays a best-of-seven series against the National League B champion for a place in the 2010–11 National League A.

Team overview

Regular season

Standings

League leaders

Scoring

Goaltenders

Playoffs

References

External links 
 

1
Swiss
National League (ice hockey) seasons